Man Kin may refer to several places in Burma:

Man Kin, Bhamo, Kachin State
Man Kin, Homalin, Sagaing Region